Daniel Karl Gay (born 5 August 1982) is a retired footballer who last played for Needham Market. He made eleven appearances in Football League Two for Southend United between 2001 and 2003.

Career
Gay graduated through the youth, academy and reserve sides at Norwich City made many first team squads and was on the bench 15 times but made no appearances in the first team and joined Football League Two club Southend United on a free transfer in 2001. He made eleven league appearances for Southend in two seasons and was called into Welsh Under-21 squads for two UEFA championship qualifiers against Azerbaijan and Serbia and Montenegro in March and April 2003, before being allowed to leave Southend at the end of the 2002–03 season. He then dropped into non-league football and played for Hornchurch. He was part of the successful side that made it to round two of the FA Cup losing 1–0 to Tramere Rovers. During that season he was named player of year and selected in the Ryman league team of the year. He had a brief trial at Bradford City F.C., who offered him a contract but due to his age compensation was required, Braintree Town, Bishops Stortford and Heybridge Swifts. Gay had a trial with Leeds United, playing in two pre-season friendlies in July 2007, before joining Chelmsford City. During his first season, the club won the Ryman league. He was released by Chelmsford City at the end of the 2008–09 season, after two seasons at the club.

He signed for Needham Market, then joined A.F.C. Sudbury in July 2011. Gay then joined Leiston in October 2013, before signing for Southern Premier Division side St Neots Town in June 2015. He then left to rejoin Needham Market.

References

External links

Danny Gay 2003–04 stats at SoccerFacts UK
Danny Gay 2004–05 stats at SoccerFacts UK
Danny Gay 2005–06 stats at SoccerFacts UK
Danny Gay 2006–07 stats at SoccerFacts UK

1982 births
Living people
Footballers from Norwich
Association football goalkeepers
English footballers
Norwich City F.C. players
Southend United F.C. players
Hornchurch F.C. players
Braintree Town F.C. players
Bishop's Stortford F.C. players
Heybridge Swifts F.C. players
Chelmsford City F.C. players
King's Lynn F.C. players
Needham Market F.C. players
A.F.C. Sudbury players
Leiston F.C. players
St Neots Town F.C. players
English Football League players
Isthmian League players
Southern Football League players